Križni Vrh is a small settlement southwest of Mokronog in the Municipality of Mokronog-Trebelno in southeastern Slovenia. The municipality is included in the Southeast Slovenia Statistical Region and is part of the historical region of Lower Carniola.

References

External links

Križni Vrh on Geopedia

Populated places in the Municipality of Mokronog-Trebelno